McDonald's Ferry was a settlement in Klamath County on the Klamath River downstream from Weitchpec, between it and Young's Ferry.  The site is now within Humboldt County.

References

Settlements formerly in Klamath County, California
Former settlements in Humboldt County, California